Major-General Christoffel 'Boetie' Venter , (1 November 1892 – 20 February 1977) was a South African military commander.

Military career 
He joined the 7th Mounted Rifles in 1912 then the 5th SAMR in August 1914 for service in South West Africa. He joined 1 South African Infantry Battalion in 1916 and served in France until he transferred to the Royal Flying Corps in February 1917. He was shot down and captured in 1918. He won the DFC and bar and was credited with 16 aerial victories, and joined the South African Air Force in 1922.

He commanded 1 Squadron SAAF and served as Officer Commanding Wits Command in 1936

He was Director-General of the Air Force from 1940 to 1945.  After World War II, he was managing director of South African Airways.

Honours and awards

Companion of the Order of the Bath

Then Major General Venter was made a Companion of the Order of the Bath on 1 January 1944

The notice in the London Gazette reads as follows:

Distinguished Flying Cross

Lieutenant Venter was awarded the Distinguished Flying Cross in 1918. The notice in the London Gazette reads as follows:

Bar to the Distinguished Flying Cross

In November 1918 he was awarded a bar to his Distinguished Flying Cross
The notice in the London Gazette reads as follows:

List 
 
 
  British War Medal
  Victory Medal (South Africa)
  King George V Coronation Medal
  King George VI Coronation Medal
  Order of the Phoenix (Greece)
  Military Cross (Belgium)

See also
List of South African military chiefs
South African Air Force

External links
 Biography at The Aerodrome

Sources

|-

1892 births
1977 deaths
Afrikaner people
South African people of Dutch descent
South African Air Force generals
Companions of the Order of the Bath
Recipients of the Distinguished Flying Cross (United Kingdom)
People from Middelburg, Eastern Cape
Recipients of the Order of the Phoenix with Swords (Greece)
South African military personnel of World War I
South African Air Force personnel of World War II
South African World War I flying aces